

The Read-York CG-12 was a  Second World War American transport glider designed for the United States Army.

Design and development
The CG-12 was a large transport glider with a seating capacity for 30 troops. Two were ordered (serials 42-68304/68305) on 24 September 1942 along with a static test airframe but the program was cancelled on 5 November 1943 following wind tunnel tests with models. The static test article, delivered on 27 July 1943, failed structural tests.

Specifications (CG-9)

See also

References

1940s United States military gliders
Glider aircraft